Truce Mountain is a  glaciated mountain summit located in the Purcell Mountains of British Columbia, Canada. The nearest higher peak is Mount Hamill,  to the southeast. Other nearby peaks include Mount Macbeth,  to the northwest, and Archduke Mountain,  to the west. The first ascent of Truce Mountain was made August 9, 1916, by Conrad Kain, H. Otto Frind, Elise Hopkins, Albert H. MacCarthy, Elizabeth MacCarthy, Margaret Stone, Winthrop E. Stone, Mrs. George E. Vincent, and John Vincent. The mountain's name was officially adopted June 9, 1960, when approved by the Geographical Names Board of Canada.


Climate
Based on the Köppen climate classification, Truce Mountain is located in a subarctic climate zone with cold, snowy winters, and mild summers. Temperatures can drop below −20 °C with wind chill factors  below −30 °C. Precipitation runoff from the mountain and meltwater from its surrounding glaciers drains into tributaries of the Duncan River.

See also
Geography of British Columbia

References

External links

 Weather: Truce Mountain
 Truce Mountain aerial photo: PBase

Three-thousanders of British Columbia
Purcell Mountains
Kootenay Land District